Deyan Hristov (born 28 February 1983) is a Bulgarian football player who plays as a striker for Vitosha Bistritsa.

Career
Hristov joined Botev Plovdiv on 6 December 2011, as a free agent, on a one-and-a-half year contract. He was released in June 2012. Hristov played for Sozopol for one season but was released in June 2017.

In July 2017, he joined Lokomotiv Gorna Oryahovitsa.  He left the club at the end of the 2017–18 season when his contract expired.

On 26 June 2018, Hristov signed with Neftochimic.

Career stats

References

External links
 
 

1983 births
Living people
People from Pavlikeni
Bulgarian footballers
First Professional Football League (Bulgaria) players
Second Professional Football League (Bulgaria) players
Kazakhstan Premier League players
PFC Naftex Burgas players
FC Pomorie players
PFC Chernomorets Burgas players
PFC Svetkavitsa players
OFC Sliven 2000 players
FC Kairat players
Botev Plovdiv players
FC Montana players
Neftochimic Burgas players
PFC Spartak Varna players
FC Vereya players
FC Septemvri Simitli players
FC Sozopol players
FC Lokomotiv Gorna Oryahovitsa players
FC Vitosha Bistritsa players
FC Sportist Svoge players
Bulgarian expatriate footballers
Bulgarian expatriate sportspeople in Kazakhstan
Expatriate footballers in Kazakhstan
Association football forwards
Sportspeople from Veliko Tarnovo Province